Tom Hurst (born February 10, 1966) is an American politician. He has been a member of the Missouri House of Representatives since 2013 and is a member of the Republican Party.

Hurst graduated from the University of Missouri in 1988 with a bachelor's degree in accounting. He has been an accountant at Hurst Tax and Accounting since 1994.

References

Living people
Republican Party members of the Missouri House of Representatives
1966 births
University of Missouri alumni
American accountants
21st-century American politicians